Didn't We may refer to:

 "Didn't We" (Richard Harris song), a 1968 song by Richard Harris
 "Didn't We" (Lee Greenwood song), a 1986 song by Lee Greenwood
 Didn't We (album), a 1970 album by Stan Getz